The Michael F. Price College of Business at the University of Oklahoma is a business school in the United States. It was established in 1917 and currently has 5,500 students. The OU Price College of Business undergraduate program currently ranks No. 64 nationally and the top-ranked business school in Oklahoma by U.S. News And World Report.

Overview
The College of Business was founded in 1917 (under the name the School of Public and Private Business), making it one of the first business schools west of the Mississippi River. It had started as the School of Commerce and Industry in 1913 under the School of Arts & Sciences, before  emerging as its present form four years later. Before World War II, the college of business administration experienced a period of tremendous growth. Between 1923 and 1929, the enrollment in the college increased over 700%. In September 1936, as a result of a legislative appropriation, a new building housing the College of Business was opened. This was named Adams Hall after Arthur Barto Adams, the dean at the time.  When it first opened, it also housed other classes, including geography, sociology, and social service. The building was designed by Joe E. Smay, the director for the school of architectural engineering.

In 1997, investor Michael F. Price donated 18 million USD to the university. Subsequently, the College of Business was renamed after him, the first OU college named for an individual. In 2002, Price donated an additional 7.2 million USD, which was a large portion of the 19 million USD needed to erect an addition to the existing Adams Hall. The new building, which completed in late 2004, was named Price Hall. Corey Phelps is the Fred E. Brown Chair and Dean of the Michael F. Price College of Business at the University of Oklahoma.

Divisions
There are eight divisions in the College of Business along with 11 majors and an undecided option. The most popular majors are accounting (14%), marketing and supply chain management (13%), and finance (13%). Other popular majors include management information systems, international business, entrepreneurship and venture management, general management, and energy management.

The U.S. News & World Report ranks the MBA program at the Price College of Business 66th in the country. The College of Business is ranked 47th in the country. It also ranks the International Business program 13th and the Management Information Systems program 16th.

In 1999, the Energy Management program changed its name from Petroleum Land Management. When this major was created, it was the first of its kind in the world.

Student organizations

Price College offers many student organizations for its various majors, including:

 Beta Alpha Psi, honorary accounting fraternity
 ConnXions
 Delta Sigma Pi
 Economics Club
 Energy Management Student Association
 ENT Club
 Finance Student Association
 International Business Association
 JCPenney Leadership Program
 MIS Student Association
 Society for Human Resource Management
 Student Business Association

The MIS Student Association (MISSA) represents the MIS undergraduate student organization.  They regularly throughout the semester provide "lunch and learns" for their members and other students. At these events, attendees can enjoy a presentation put on over various subjects by local and out of state businesses that regularly recruit and hire out of the MIS department.

The MISSA faculty advisers are Professor Mano Ratwatte and Professor Nate Stout.

Notes

External links
Price College of Business
University of Oklahoma

Price College of Business
Price College of Business
Educational institutions established in 1917
1917 establishments in Oklahoma